Galu may refer to:
Galu, Iran (disambiguation)
Galu, Kenya
Galu, Romania